The women's 80 metres hurdles event at the 1965 Summer Universiade was held at the People's Stadium in Budapest on 26 August 1965.

Medalists

Results

Heats
Wind:Heat 1: +4.3 m/s, Heat 2: +4.6 m/s

Final

References

Athletics at the 1965 Summer Universiade
1965